Zoran Pešić (born 9 May 1951) is a Serbian former professional football player and manager.

Early life

Pešić studied at the University of Belgrade as well as at the University for Physical Education in Novi Sad. He has over 22 years of active experience as a football player in several European squads including Red Star Belgrade, Hannover 96, FC Singen 04, St. Gallen FC and Orient FC.

Playing career
Pešić played for Red Star Belgrade for 16 years, where he rose from the junior ranks to playing professionally for the side. A promising talent, Pešić has represented Yugoslavia at under 17, under 20 and under 23 levels. He also played in the Fußball-Bundesliga and Swiss Super League.

Coaching career
After retiring as a football player, Pešić began to use his many years' experience as a player in coaching. Pešić coached several African sides, including Zimbabwe's Dynamos F.C. and Amazulu FC, Angola's Inter Luanda, South Africa's Hellenic, Manning Rangers and Ria Stars as well as Mozambique's Clube de Desportos do Maxaquene.

Pešić has coached both Manning Rangers and Hellenic from certain relegation, which has earned him the nickname "The Savior".

External links
 https://web.archive.org/web/20140628203748/http://www.rsssf.com/tablesa/ango03.html
 http://www.iol.co.za/index.php?set_id=6&click_id=19&art_id=ct20001101225504383T200675
 http://www.sundayindependent.co.za/index.php?fSectionId=&fArticleId=ct20010209104015473S610737
 http://www.sundaytribune.co.za/index.php?fSectionId=&fArticleId=qw1029845701127S163
 http://www.opais.co.mz/index.php?view=article&catid=74%3Adesporto&id=2039%3Amaxaquene-zoran-pesic-coloca-lugar-a-disposicao&option=com_content&Itemid=275
 http://www.al-akhbar.com/node/200096
 http://www.aljadeed.tv/MenuAr/sport/DetailNews/DetailSport.html?Id=16726
 http://africa.widmi.com/index.php/egypt/a1/007/245595-زوران-بيسيتش-أريد-جنوداً-في-الأنصار

1951 births
Living people
Footballers from Belgrade
Serbia and Montenegro football managers
Serbian football managers
Dynamos F.C. managers
Manning Rangers F.C. managers
Hellenic F.C. managers
G.D. Interclube managers
FK Mornar managers
Al Ansar FC managers
Lebanese Premier League managers
Serbia and Montenegro expatriate football managers
Expatriate football managers in Zimbabwe
Expatriate soccer managers in South Africa
Expatriate football managers in Angola
Serbian expatriate football managers
Expatriate football managers in Mozambique
Serbian expatriate sportspeople in South Africa
Expatriate football managers in Montenegro
Serbian expatriate sportspeople in Montenegro
Expatriate football managers in Lebanon
Serbian expatriate sportspeople in Lebanon